Shahr-i Now  is a town in north-eastern Afghanistan . It is located in Khwahan District to Badakhshan province.

See also
Badakhshan Province

References

External links
Now/ Satellite map at Maplandia.com

Populated places in Khwahan District